Churicheni is a village in Petrich Municipality, in Blagoevgrad Province, Bulgaria. As of 2013, it had a population of 24.

Honours
Churicheni Island in Antarctica is named after the village of Churicheni.

References

Villages in Blagoevgrad Province